The following are the winners of the 21st annual (1994) Origins Award, presented at Origins 1995:

External links
 1994 Origins Awards Winners

1994 awards
1994 awards in the United States
Origins Award winners